Krystian Michallik (born 13 May 1944) is a Polish footballer. He played in two matches for the Poland national football team from 1966 to 1968.

References

External links
 

1944 births
Living people
Polish footballers
Poland international footballers
Place of birth missing (living people)
Association footballers not categorized by position